Cape Malays (in Arabic script) also known as Cape Muslims or Malays, are a Muslim community or ethnic group in South Africa. They are the descendants of enslaved and free Muslims from different parts of the world who lived at the Cape during Dutch and British rule.

Although the initial members of the community were from the Dutch colonies of South East Asia, by the 1800s the term Malay encompassed all practising Muslims at the Cape, regardless of origin. They initially used Malay as a lingua franca and language of religious instruction, and this was one of the likely reasons that the community were referred to as Malays.

Malays are concentrated in the Cape Town area. Cape Malay cuisine forms a significant part of South African cuisine, and the community played an important part in the history of Islam in South Africa. The community played a part in developing Afrikaans as a written language, initially using an Arabic script.

"Malay" was legally a subcategory of the Coloured racial group during the apartheid era.

History

The Dutch East India Company (VOC) founded and established a colony at the Cape of Good Hope (the Dutch Cape Colony), as a resupply station for ships travelling between Europe and Asia, which developed into the city of Cape Town. The Dutch had also colonised the Dutch East Indies (present-day Indonesia), which formed a part of the Dutch Empire for several centuries, and Dutch Malacca, which the Dutch held from 1641 to 1824.

Key figures in the arrival of Islam were Muslim leaders who resisted the Company's rule in Southeast Asia who, like Sheikh Yusuf, a Muslim scholar from Sulawesi were exiled to South Africa by the company. They were followed by slaves from other parts of Asia and Africa. Although it is not possible to accurately reconstruct the origins of slaves in the Cape, it has been estimated that roughly equal proportions of Malagasies, Indians, Insulindians (Southeast Asians) and continental Africans were imported to the Cape, with other estimates showing that the majority of slaves originated in Madagascar.

Many "Indiaanen" and "Mohammedaanen" Muslim political prisoners brought from East Asia were imprisoned on Robben Island. Among these were Tuan Guru, first chief imam in South Africa. Sheikh Madura was exiled in the 1740s and died on Robben Island; his kramat (shrine) is still there today.

Although the majority of slaves from South East Asia were already Muslims, along with many Indians, those from Madagascar and elsewhere in Africa were not. The slaves from Asia tended to work in semi-skilled and domestic roles, and they made up a disproportionate share of 18th century manumissions, who subsequently settled in Bo-Kaap, while those from elsewhere  in Africa and Madagascar tended to work as farm-hands, and were not freed at the same rate. In the latter part of the 18th century, conversions to Islam of the rural non-Asian slaves increased due to a Dutch colonial law that encouraged owners to educate their slaves in Christianity, and following their baptism, to allow them to buy their freedom; this consequently resulted in slave-owners, fearful of losing their slaves, not enforcing Christianity amongst them. This, in turn, allowed Islamic proselytisers to convert the slaves.

There were also skilled Muslim labourers called Mardijkers from Southeast Asia who settled in the Bo-Kaap area of Cape Town.

After the British took the Cape, and began phasing out slavery in the first half of the 19th century, the newly-freed non-Asian Muslim rural slaves moved to Cape Town, the only centre of Islamic faith in the region. The South and Southeast Asians constituted the Muslim establishment in the colony, and the newly freed slaves subsequently adopted the Malay language used by the Asians.  Thus, Malay was the initial lingua franca of Muslims, though they came from East Africa, Madagascar, and India, as well as Indonesia and established the moniker "Malay" for all Muslims at the Cape irrespective of their geographic origins, and by the 19th century, the term was used to describe anyone at the Cape who was a practising Muslim, despite Afrikaans having overtaken Malay as the group's lingua franca.

The community adopted Afrikaans as a lingua franca to ease communication with between the Asian and non-Asian Muslims (who had adopted the Dutch used by their masters), and because the utility of Malay and the Malayo-Portuguese language were diminished due to the British ban on slave imports in 1808, reducing the need to communicate with newcomers. The non-Asian and Asian Muslims interacted socially despite the initial linguistic differences, and gradually blended into a single community.

"Malay" was legally a subcategory of the Coloured race group during Apartheid, though the delineation of Malays and the remaining defined Coloured subgroups by government officials was often imprecise and subjective.

Cultural identity

The Cape Malays (in Arabies script) also known as Cape Muslims or simply Malays, are a Muslim community or ethnic group in South Africa. 

The Cape Malay identity can be considered the product of a set of histories and communities as much as it is a definition of an ethnic group. Since many Cape Malay people have found their Muslim identity to be more salient than their "Malay" ancestry, in some contexts they have been described as "Cape Malay", or "Malays" and others as Cape Muslim by people both inside and outside of the community. Cape Malay ancestry includes people from South and Southeast Asia, Madagascar, and Khoekhoe. Later, Muslim male "Passenger Indian" migrants to the Cape married into the Cape Malay community, with their children being classified as Cape Malay.

Muslim men in the Cape started wearing the Turkish fez after the arrival of Abu Bakr Effendi, an imam sent from the Ottoman Empire at the request of the British Empire to teach Islam in the Cape Colony. At a time when most imams in the Cape were teaching the Shafi`i school of Islamic jurisprudence, Effendi was the first teacher of Hanafi school, and established madrassas (Islamic schools) in Cape Town. Effendi, in common with many Turkish Muslims, wore a distinctive red fez Many Cape Malay men continued to wear the distinctive red fez (in particular the Malay Malay choirs), although black was also common and more recently other colours had become popular. The last fez-maker in Cape Town finally shut up shop in March 2022; 76-year-old Gosain Samsodien had been making fezzes in his home-factory in Kensington for 25 years.

Demographics
It is estimated that there are about 166,000 people in Cape Town who could be described as Cape Malay, and about 10,000 in Johannesburg. The picturesque Malay Quarter of Cape Town is found on Signal Hill, and is called the Bo-Kaap.

Many Cape Malay people also lived in District Six before they, among many other South African people of diverse ethnicity, mainly Cape Coloureds, were forcefully removed from their homes by the apartheid government and redistributed into townships on the Cape Flats.

Culture
The founders of this community were the first to bring Islam to South Africa. The community's culture and traditions have also left an impact that is felt to this day. The Muslim community in Cape Town remains large and vibrant. It has expanded greatly beyond those exiles who started the first mosques in South Africa.

People in the Cape Malay community predominantly speak Afrikaans, but frequently also English. They no longer speak the languages which their ancestors used, such as Malay although various Malay words and phrases are still employed in daily usage. There is a strong Indian influence in the Cape Malay culture due to generations of widespread intermarriage and union between the two communities.

Cuisine

Adaptations of traditional foods such as bredie, bobotie, sosaties and koeksisters are staples in many South African homes. Faldela Williams wrote three cookbooks, including The Cape Malay Cookbook, which became instrumental in preserving the cultural traditions of Cape Malay cuisine. The Indian influence in the Cape Malay culture is essential due to generations of widespread intermarriage and union between the two communities.

Music

This cultural group developed a characteristic Cape Malay music. Cape Malay music has been of great interest to academics, historians, musicologists, writers and even politicians.

A secular folk song type of Dutch origin, is known as the nederlandslied. The language and musical style of this genre reflects the history of South African slavery, and the words and music often reflect sadness and other emotions related to the effect of enslavement. The nederlandslied shows the influence of the Arabesque style of singing, and is unique in South Africa, Africa and probably in the world.

The Silver Fez is the "Holy Grail" of the musical subculture. The contest involves thousands of musicians and a wide variety of tunes, with all-male choirs from the Malay community competing for the prize. A 2009 documentary film directed by Lloyd Ross (founder of Shifty Records) called The Silver Fez focuses on an underdog competing for the award.

The well-known annual Cape Town Minstrel Carnival (formerly known as the Coon Carnival) is a deep-rooted Cape Malay cultural event; it incorporates the Cape Malay comic song or moppie (often also referred to as ghoema songs), as well as the nederlandslied. The barrel-shaped drum, called the ghoema (also spelt ghomma and also known as dhol), is also closely associated with Cape Malay music, along with other percussion instruments the rebanna (rebana) and tamarien (tambourine). Stringed instruments include the ra'king, gom-gom, and besem (also known as skiffelbas). The ghomma has been traditionally used mostly for marching or rhythmic songs known as the "ghommaliedjie", while the guitar is used for lyrical songs.

International relationships
Connections between Malaysians and South Africans improved when South Africa rejoined the international community. The latter's re-entry was welcomed by the Malaysian government and many others in the Southeast Asian region. Non-governmental organisations, such as the Federation of Malaysia Writers' Associations, have since set on linking up with the diasporic Cape Malay community.

There is also an increase in the interest of the food, culture and heritage of Cape Malay descendants around the world.

References

Further reading

Official South African history site Early context for "Cape Malay" community
Haron, Muhammed (2001). "Conflict of Identities: The Case of South Africa’s Cape Malays" 
Sparse website with some information about Cape Malay musical instruments and music

External links
Cape Mazaar Society (formerly The Robben Island Mazaar (Kramat) Committee") 

 
Ethnic groups in South Africa
Indonesian diaspora
Malay diaspora
History of the Dutch East India Company
Articles containing video clips